Focus is the second studio album by Japanese visual kei band Diaura, released on 4 December 2013, by blowgrow. It debuted on Oricon's weekly chart at the 49th place. This is the band's first full album with Tatsuya on the drums. The DVD included with the album contained the music video for the song "Trigger". The song titled "Sirius" was previously released as a single on July 10, 2013.

Track listing

References

2013 albums
Diaura albums